Mount VX-6 is a distinctive, sharp mountain, standing  north of Minaret Nunatak in the Monument Nunataks in Victoria Land, East Antarctica.

Discovery and naming
Surveyed by the United States Antarctic Research Program (USARP) Victoria Land Traverse Party, 1959–60. They named it for U.S. Navy Air Development Squadron Six (VX-6) which supported the traverse party in the field. On January 1, 1969, the squadron was redesignated Antarctic Development Squadron Six (VXE-6) but its mission remained the same.

References

Mountains of Victoria Land
Pennell Coast